The Northeast Pennsylvania Classic was a golf tournament on the Nationwide Tour from 2000 to 2009. It was played at the Elmhurst Country Club in Moscow, Pennsylvania from 2008 to 2009. From 2000 to 2007, it was played at the Glenmaura National Golf Club in Moosic, Pennsylvania.

The 2009 purse was $525,000 with $94,500 going to the winner.

Winners

Bolded golfers graduated to the PGA Tour via the final Nationwide Tour money list.

External links
Coverage on the Nationwide Tour's official site

Former Korn Ferry Tour events
Golf in Pennsylvania
Scranton, Pennsylvania
Tourist attractions in Lackawanna County, Pennsylvania